Caroline Taylor (born 20 August 1973 in Newtown, Powys) is a Welsh international lawn and indoor bowler.

Bowls career
In 2011, she won three medals including two golds at the European Bowls Championships in Portugal. She won a bronze medal in the triples at the 2012 World Outdoor Bowls Championship in Adelaide.

She was selected as part of the Welsh team for the 2018 Commonwealth Games on the Gold Coast in Queensland

In 2020, she was selected for the 2020 World Outdoor Bowls Championship in Australia. In 2022, she competed in the women's pairs and the Women's fours at the 2022 Commonwealth Games.

References

External links
 
 

1973 births
Living people
Welsh female bowls players
Commonwealth Games competitors for Wales
Bowls players at the 2018 Commonwealth Games
Bowls players at the 2022 Commonwealth Games
Bowls European Champions